Communist Party of Turkey-Revolutionary Wing (in Turkish: Türkiye Komünist Partisi-Devrimci Kanat) was a short-lived splintergroup of the Communist Party of Turkey. TKP-DK appeared in 1980.

See also
List of illegal political parties in Turkey
Communist Party of Turkey (disambiguation) for other communist parties in Turkey

1980 establishments in Turkey
Defunct communist parties in Turkey
Political parties established in 1980